Shaphat (Latin and Douay–Rheims: Saphat) of Abel-meholah:  a man in the Bible, father of Elisha.

Books of Kings people